Thomas Boone Fraser (June 21, 1860 – May 21, 1925) was an associate justice of the South Carolina Supreme Court. He was elected on January 11, 1912. He was sworn in on January 12, 1912. He died on May 21, 1925, and is buried at the Sumter Cemetery in Sumter, South Carolina.

References

Justices of the South Carolina Supreme Court
People from South Carolina
1860 births
1925 deaths